The Cape Ann League (CAL) is a high school athletic conference in District A of the Massachusetts Interscholastic Athletic Association. The league is based mainly on or around Cape Ann, a small cape on the North Shore of Massachusetts

Member schools 
The CAL has twelve member schools in northeastern Massachusetts. The schools in the Cape Ann League are split into two divisions: Cape Ann Kinney and Cape Ann Baker.

The Kinney division incorporates the schools with six largest enrollment within the league and compete in Division 3 for football.  The Baker division incorporates the schools with six smallest enrollment within the league and compete in Division 4 for football.

Current members

Former members

History 

Longtime Secretary and Treasurer of the Cape Ann League, Dick Baker, steps down after 41 years with the Cape Ann League. Baker also spent 18 years with the Northeastern Conference.

Beginning in the 2011-12 season, Wilmington High School moved to the Middlesex League along with Arlington High School moving from the Dual County League.

Prior to the 2012-13 school year, North Andover High School left the Cape Ann League after forty years to join the Merrimack Valley Conference (MVC).

On December 14, 2012, Saugus High School announced on their Twitter account that they would join the Cape Ann League, leaving the Northeastern Conference for more success in their school athletics. On January 18, 2013, the move was approved by the Massachusetts Interscholastic Athletic Association.

At the conclusion of Saugus High School's first season in the Cape Ann League, they requested to rejoin the Northeastern Conference due to geographic and traveling issues. The rejoin was approved by both high school conferences allowing Saugus High School to return to the Northeastern Conference.  All sports would play in the Northeastern Conference, with the exception of football which would become independent for the 2014 fall season.  The Saugus Sachems football team would play opponents from both the Cape Ann League and Northeastern Conference.

Beginning in the 2023-2024 school year, Essex Tech became a member of the Cape Ann League after many years playing in the Commonwealth Athletic Conference.

Sports
The Cape Ann League sponsors championship competition in twelve men's, eleven women's, and one coed MIAA sanctioned sports.

Coed sponsored sports by school

Men's sponsored sports by school

Women's sponsored sports by school

Current champions
 Italics indicate 2014–15 champion

Source: MAScores.com Cape Ann League

References 

 
Massachusetts Interscholastic Athletic Association leagues